Lorcia Khumalo (née Cooper) (born 9 November 1978), is a South African actress and dancer. She is best known for her roles in the popular television serials Backstage, Scandal, Lockdown, Zulu Wedding and Hey Boy.

Personal life
She was born on 9 November 1978 in Cape Town, South Africa. She is married to Mandla Khumalo. The couple has one daughter and one son.

In 2019, she suffered with swollen lymph nodes in thyroid. For the treatment, she had carbon dioxide injections for the puffiness around her eye.

Career
When she was four years old, her parents enrolled her to a dancing class after seeing her passion for dancing and competed at Latin American and Ballroom dancing competitions. At the age of five, she won her first competition in the provincial championships for both Ballroom and Latin American dances. At age of eight, she attended to the Academy of Dance and studied dancing under renowned choreographer Debby Turner, who became her mentor and guide. Later she joined the North West Arts Council's Dance Academy where she was lucky to be a teacher in late years. When she was 19 years old, she won the FNB Vita Best Female Dancer Award.

She later joined with SABC2 channel and became a Travel Xplorer presenter. During this period, she was invited to play the lead role 'Cindi' in the film Hey Boy directed by Andre Odendaal which was aired in 2003. In 2008, she was appointed as one of the judges in the dancing competition, Dans! Dans! Dans! aired on ykNET. In 2008, she became the choreographer and judge in the reality competition, 'High School Musical: Spotlight South Africa' aired on M-Net.

In 2017, she played in the Mzansi Magic show, Lockdown with the role of 'Tyson' in its fourth season. In the same year, she played the supportive role 'Marang' in the film Zulu Wedding. In March 2019, she won the Best Supporting Actress Award at the SAFTA awards for her role in Lockdown 2. In September 2020, she appeared in the Mzansi drama series Housekeepers with the role 'Mkhonto'.

Television roles
 #Karektas as a celebrity guest judge
 Backstage as Charmaine Jacobs
 Bedford Wives as Lorna Williams
 Change Down as a celebrity guest judge
 Eish! Saan as a celebrity prankster
 It's OK We're Family as herself
 The Bantu Hour as Guest 
 The Comedy Central Roast as herself
 Housekeepers as Mkhonto
 Still Breathing as Lucille
 Lockdown as Tyson
 Zulu Wedding as Marang
 Hey Boy as Cindi
 Hosted of the second season of Showville* . 
 Presenter of season 11 and 13 of The South African Film and Television Awards
 The Estate as Jo Mohammed

References

External links
 

Living people
People from Cape Town
South African television actresses
1978 births
South African dancers
South African film actresses
South African choreographers